Antero Immonen (born 15 December 1935) is a Finnish ski jumper. He competed in the normal hill and large hill events at the 1964 Winter Olympics.

References

External links
 

1935 births
Living people
Finnish male ski jumpers
Olympic ski jumpers of Finland
Ski jumpers at the 1964 Winter Olympics
People from Kotka
Sportspeople from Kymenlaakso